Clorindione is a vitamin K antagonist. It is a derivative of phenindione.

References

Further reading
 

Vitamin K antagonists
Chloroarenes
Indandiones